The Haunted Hat is a 1915 American silent comedy film featuring Oliver Hardy.

Cast
 Will Louis as The Boss (?probably Willard Louis)
 Oliver Hardy (as Babe Hardy)

See also
 List of American films of 1915
 Oliver Hardy filmography

External links

1915 films
1915 short films
American silent short films
American black-and-white films
1915 comedy films
Silent American comedy films
American comedy short films
1910s American films